The Otonabee River is a river in Peterborough County in Central Ontario, Canada. The river flows from Katchewanooka Lake, at the north end of the community of Lakefield, through the city of Peterborough to Rice Lake. It is in the Great Lakes Basin and forms part of the Trent-Severn Waterway.

Etymology
The river is called Odoonabii-ziibi in the Ojibwe language. Otonabee comes from the words ode which means "heart" and odemgat that comes from "boiling water". It translates into "the river that beats like a heart in reference to the bubbling and boiling water of the rapids along the river".

Course
The river begins at Katchewanooka Lake on the north side of the community of Lakefield in the municipality of Selwyn, and flows south over the Lakefield (Trent-Severn lock 6) dams and locks. After leaving the community to the Peterborough city limits, the river forms the border between Selwyn and the municipality of Douro–Dummer. The river continues south, passing through the dams associated with four more locks, enters the city of Peterborough, and passes under Faryon Bridge at Trent University. Just south of the university, the Trent-Severn departs via a south-bound canal to the Peterborough Lift Lock east of the river, while the river continues south to the west. The Trent-Severn waterway rejoins the river there, exiting from Ashburnham Lock. The river leaves Little Lake at Scotts Mills lock & dam, and heads south, passes under Ontario Highway 7, passes into the municipality of Otonabee–South Monaghan, and snakes its way without any other locks or dams to reach its mouth at Rice Lake, which flows via the Trent River to Lake Ontario.

Hydrology
Some areas of Peterborough along the Otonabee are prone to flooding following heavy rains, such as happened on July 15, 2004 when 240 mm (7.3 in) fell in some locations in under twenty-four hours.

History
Both Susanna Moodie and Catharine Parr Traill lived on farms near Katchewanooka Lake.

Economy
Trent University operates its own hydroelectric plant on the river.

Islands
Cow Island is located to the west of the mouth of the Otonabee River.

Tributaries
Steamboat Creek (right)
Kent Creek (left)
Squirrel Creek (right)
Lepers Creek (right)
Baxter Creek (right)
Cavan Creek (right)
Meade Creek (left)
Whitlaw Creek (left)
Jackson Creek (right)
Sawer Creek (left)

See also
List of Ontario rivers

References

Sources

External links 

 Otonabee Region Conservation website

Peterborough, Ontario
Rivers of Peterborough County
Trent–Severn Waterway